is a fictional character originally from the former SNK's 1987 video game Psycho Soldier. An esper, Athena is a descendant of Princess Athena from the earlier Athena game. She later appears in The King of Fighters series of fighting games as a member of the Psycho Soldier Team alongside her friend Sie Kensou and her teacher Chin Gentsai. While there have been changes to the team, Athena has been consistently playable in the main series. She was also given her own video game Athena: Awakening from the Ordinary Life, which was only released in Japanese regions for the PlayStation in 1999.

Athena was designed with idea of having an appealing main character in Psycho Soldier following the staff's negative reaction to the Athena video game. The use of a character song and multiple outfits resulted in major praise by publications for video games. Nevertheless, the character also received negative criticism.

Creation and design

Athena Asamiya is based on the title character from SNK's video game Athena. The staff did not like the title character and thus wanted to create an improved sequel, Psycho Soldier. Athena has long pink hair and wears a black Japanese school uniform. In order to generate contrast between the two Athenas, Psycho Soldiers was designed to look more mature. In retrospective, character designer Ogura felt Athena's marketing as an idol was ahead of its time, citing things such as her songs and anime-like illustrations. The fact that Athena changed outfits in every game felt like something that Ogura believed would appeal to the demographic. 

For The King of Fighters '94 series, there was pressure within staff about including the character. The staff worked so much on her that other developers accused them of favoritism. One of the designers tried to explain Athena's poses but the developers found it funny. Feeling pressure with how Western players would react to her high school look, SNK instead decided to design her wearing a different outfit which is first seen in her character's introduction when removing her high school look.

Athena wears new outfits in every game, some with little changes. Her hair, however, is purple and becomes short from The King of Fighters '99 to The King of Fighters 2001, and regardless of her outfit, one item that remains relatively unchanged is the tiara she wears on her hair, with accompanying star-shaped hairpins. The staff from the series has been requested by fans to return her Japanese school uniform in several games, but they only made her wear it only in her introductions as they thought it would not be well received by gamers from other countries. In the Maximum Impact series, her normal costume as the basis for it, it is piece of "cute clothing that she has per her heart and soul into". On the other hand, her "Another" is a "school wear" outfit with glasses according to the staff.

However, by The King of Fighters XI, Athena appears with a white school uniform and in The King of Fighters XII she returns to her original Psycho Soldier outfit as the members from SNK wanted to return The King of Fighters series to its "original concept". In The King of Fighters XIII, Athena returns wearing the same clothes but with a color alteration (white shirt and blue skirt; more in line with her attire from The King of Fighters XI). Eisuke Ogura was given multiple directions by the game staff in how Athena should look such as her facial expressions and limbs. Director Kei Yamamoto explained many of Athena's mechanics are based on psychic moves with  being one of her most famous ones. Yamamoto explained that the XIII staff worked to produce balanced variations of her attacks. Her strongest move in that game, the  brought multiple difficulties to the team but in the end SNK were satisfied with the result.
When making The King of Fighters XIV with the Unreal Engine, the original game had more realistic visuals but clashed with character models Athena's and Kula Diamond's models that have been compared with anime-like series so they opted for the current look. The character was redesigned by Keisuke Ogura rather than veteran Nobuyuki Kuroki in order to appeal to newcomers. Sound director Asakana found Athena as character who remained faithful to previous incarnations to the point the staff had fun designing her. According to SNK, Athena's appearance from The King of Fighters '98 remains as the most popular within the fanbase which led to her inclusion in XIV as downloadable content.

For the spin-off SNK Heroines: Tag Team Frenzy, Athena was given a magical girl-like outfit that would also fit her characterization. Multiple accessories were then added in order to appeal to a young demographic to the point of making her look like a main character. Bracelets were meant to look like morphing accessories on a comical note. Ogura wanted to give her a staff but the idea was rejected by the team. Nevertheless, the main theme of the game was that the cast would wear an outfit they would not like. Yasuyuki Oda stated it was difficult how to perform Athena's 3D models and yet making it look like her original 2D model.

Athena has been voiced by several voice actresses since her debut in Psycho Soldier in which she was played by Rushina in the game and Kaori Shimizu for her image songs. For The King of Fighters series, Athena has been played by several actresses. Reiko Fukui voiced her in The King of Fighters '94, Moe Nagasaki in The King of Fighters '95, Tamao Satō in The King of Fighters '96 and Yukina Kurisu in The King of Fighters '97 and The King of Fighters: Kyo. Since The King of Fighters '98, Athena has been voiced by Haruna Ikezawa in each game she is featured as well as the anime The King of Fighters: Another Day and The King of Fighters: Destiny. Lily Kong voiced Athena in the English dub of The King of Fighters: Maximum Impact 2.

Appearances

In video games
Athena first appears in the video game Psycho Soldier, fighting against several creatures attacking Earth along with her friend Sie Kensou. She would also appear in the crossover fighting game series The King of Fighters as part of the Psycho Soldier Team. The Psycho Soldier Team is initially composed of Kensou and Athena's teacher, Chin Gentsai. The team would be present in most King of Fighters tournament as Chin wanted to train more Kensou and Athena as well as searching for evil forces such as the demon Orochi. The team has little changes within tournaments with the only new member joining them being Bao from The King of Fighters '99 until The King of Fighters 2001. The King of Fighters '99: Evolution also contains a Striker version from Athena with her school uniform. By The King of Fighters 2003, the Psycho Soldier Team retires from competition as Kensou and Bao needed to train their new powers. As such, Athena second another variant of Heroine Fighters Team known as the High School Girls Team along with the Sumo fighter Hinako Shijo, who had been part of the Women Fighters Team in the previous two tournaments, and a mysterious girl named Malin. The Psycho Soldier Team returns in The King of Fighters XI with Athena, Kensou and Momoko, a young girl able to use Psychic powers. In The King of Fighters XII, Athena is playable, but like each character, she has no official teams, due to its beta state. In sequel, a finalized version of The King of Fighters XII, The King of Fighters XIII, she is back with Kensou and Chin representing the Psycho Soldiers; she and reappear in The King of Fighters XIV. 
 In The King of Fighters XV, Athena joins Mai and Yuri to form a new super version of Heroine Fighters Team, as foreshadowed by her conversations with one of the Women Fighters’ team members in two games prior, and most likely an exchange request between her and original Women Fighters leader King, who re-joins Art of Fighting team.

She is also featured in the spin-off games The King of Fighters: Battle de Paradise, The King of Fighters Neowave, KOF: Maximum Impact 1 and 2, and KOF ALL STARS. In the Maximum Impact series, Athena has a self-proclaimed rival named Mignon Beart whom she does not acknowledge or know her. Athena also appears in the spin-off video games The King of Fighters R-1 and The King of Fighters R-2 as part of the Heroine Team with Mai Shiranui and Yuri Sakazaki and in the sequel with Kazumi and Yuri once again. She is also present in the role-playing game The King of Fighters: Kyo where she and Kensou travel to Japan to meet Kyo Kusanagi, befriending Kyo's girlfriend, Yuki, in the process. The two can also be recruited for Kyo's team in the 1997 tournament. Athena, Kensou and Bao are also present in two Game Boy Advance games The King of Fighters EX: Neo Blood and The King of Fighters EX2: Howling Blood. Other two 	scrolling shooters, KOF: Sky Stage and Neo Geo Heroes: Ultimate Shooting, feature her as a playable character, while the role-playing game for mobile phones The King of Fighters '98: Online had her as part of the cast.

In the 3D adventure game Athena: Awakening from the Ordinary Life, Athena has to find answers about strange things that happened in her school, and later in various parts of Japan related with her psychic powers. She was also added to the crossover series SNK vs. Capcom, being playable in SNK vs. Capcom: The Match of the Millennium and Capcom vs. SNK 2. Her character also appears in SNK Gals' Fighters as a playable character, with Athena wanting to win the Gals' tournament to recover her long hair, while in SNK Heroines: Tag Team Frenzy she is trapped in a new tournament. Athena appears also in the dating game series Days of Memories, in which each game is presented with different personalities (and even with different ages). She is also present in Metal Slug Defense, Brave Frontier and The Rhythm of Fighters. Besides spin-offs, Athena has been the main character of the mobile phone game Athena on Stage. She also appears in Super Smash Bros. Ultimate as a Spirit as well as a cameo in the King of Fighters Stadium stage.

In other media
Athena also appears in several comic adaptations from The King of Fighters series which retell the story from various video games. In Masato Natsumoto's manga The King of Fighters: Kyo, Athena has a crush on Kyo Kusanagi, being also interested in his abilities. She appears in several chapters from the series along with Kensou as they investigate the powers from Iori Yagami. In the manga from Ryo Takamisaki, The King of Fighters G, Athena is featured as one of the lead characters participating in The King of Fighters '96 tournament along with Kyo and Mature, a servant from the demon Orochi. She also makes a short appearance in the 2006 original net animation The King of Fighters: Another Day helping citizens from Southtown in a fire. In the live-action drama entitled Athena, her character is portrayed by Kei Ishibashi, while the story is based on the video game Athena: Awakening from the Ordinary Life. Athena also has her own CD soundtrack named  as part of the 20th anniversary from the video games of Athena. The CD was published by Happinet and contains various tracks based on Athena's character. In the web series The King of Fighters: Destiny Athena faces Rugal Bernstein alongside other fighters during the climax but is defeated.

In merchandise
Her character is also featured in various types of merchandising such as figurines from KOF: Maximum Impact and SNK Beach Volley. Athena was also featured along with Mai Shiranui as a part of a set of two action figures with both her character being chibi. A key-chain from her character was also released by SNK. Athena was the featured character on a 'Neoprint' photo printing machine for a while.

Reception
The character of Athena has been very popular within gamers; in the character popularity poll on Neo Geo Freak's website in 2000, she was voted as the tenth favorite character with a total of 1,020 votes. Japanese magazine Gamest ranked Athena at No. 3 in the list of Top 50 Characters of 1994. In June 2018 it was revealed Athena would become a virtual Youtuber retaining Haruna Ikezawa's voice. Athena's transformation into a virtual Youtuber has been noted to be as sign of high popularity of both the character and the company that created her, SNK. In 2018, Athena was voted as the eighth most popular Neo Geo character. Two of the characters from Crystalis are subtle nods to Athena and Kensou; the latter two sages, Asina and Kensu. Den of Geek had mixed thoughts about her character, praising the way she changes outfits in every game and fighting style but criticized her spin-offs and association.

Various video games publications have commented on Athena's character, which has received mixed responses. GamesRadar acclaimed Athena and Sie Kensou in their first appearance, Psycho Soldier, for being one of the first characters to have their own theme songs which The King of Fighters would remix multiple times across its titles. PSPMinis found Athena's relationship with the goddess nonsensical and attributes that players would not have knowledge about it if it were not for the internet because the game does not provide information for this. The IGN staff commented that Athena's introductions in the first The King of Fighters seemed a parody of Chun-Li from the Street Fighter series as she wears a similar school outfit. In another review, the writers from IGN noted Athena's skill as an assistant character (named "Striker") to heal characters during fights in The King of Fighters '99 to be one of the best of the game although it has to be used carefully as it is limited. When she was announced to appear in Capcom vs. SNK 2, David Smith from IGN praised her addition to the game but was confused about from what game Athena was going to be based as she has several incarnations. In a bigger note about The King of Fighters franchise, Den of Geek found the relationship between Athena and Kensou as dated because the latter was in love with the former and after multiple games, Kensou did not confess her feelings. Nevertheless, the handling of the Psycho Soldiers Team in the fighting games was found hilarious due to how the group appear to have relevant storylines in NESTS story arc yet following games starting XI the endings are shown in a comical point of view. Kakuchopurei felt Athena and Kensou were well adapted into The King of Fighters due to how despite the change of genre, they fit well thanks to their fighting style.

Journalists have also expressed multiple opinions on the character's looks that have been featured in The King of Fighters series. Athena's redesign for The King of Fighters XII earned negative responses by Game Zone due to how different she looks from her previous incarnations. Her new appearance was noted to be one of the biggest changes from the series by Todd Ciolek from Anime News Network who commented that Athena "looks to have been de-aged five or six years". GameSpot writer Hirohiko Niizumi claimed that several fans complained on this new design as it looked "chubby", but mentioned Athena looked normal-size in comparison to other characters from the game. Ryan King from the Official Xbox Magazine noted that her new appearance makes her look "more pop star-esque than ever". Power Up Bits criticized Athena's voice actress from XIV to the point of wishing her to be mute in the game. Siliconera enjoyed the way her character was handled in SNK Heroines due to the musical notes that appear whenever she attacks an opponent, as well as an alternate outfit that makes her look like the original Princess Athena. Polygon noted that Athena's bikini outfit appeared to hint that SNK Heroines might be intentionally fanservice due to the focus on skimpy clothing.

References

Athena games
Female characters in anime and manga
Female characters in video games
Fictional Japanese people in video games
Fictional martial artists in video games
Fictional Wing Chun practitioners
Fictional singers
Singer characters in video games
SNK protagonists
Teenage characters in video games
The King of Fighters characters
Woman soldier and warrior characters in video games
Video game characters introduced in 1987
Video game characters who have mental powers
Video game characters who can teleport
Fictional characters who can manipulate light
Video game characters who can move at superhuman speeds